Carabus perrini planus is a subspecies of black-coloured beetle in the family Carabidae that can be found in Georgia, Russia, and Ukraine.

References

perrini planus
Beetles of Europe
Beetles described in 1885